The Xuanwu Gate Incident was a palace coup for the throne of the Tang dynasty on 2 July 626, when Prince Li Shimin (Prince of Qin) and his followers assassinated Crown Prince Li Jiancheng and Prince Li Yuanji (Prince of Qi). Li Shimin, the second son of Emperor Gaozu of Tang, was in an intense rivalry with his elder brother Li Jiancheng and younger brother Li Yuanji. He took control and set up an ambush at Xuanwu Gate, the northern gate leading to the Palace City of the imperial capital Chang'an. There, Li Jiancheng and Li Yuanji were murdered by Li Shimin and his men. Within three days after the coup, Li Shimin was installed as the crown prince. Emperor Gaozu abdicated another sixty days later and passed the throne to Li Shimin, who would become known as Emperor Taizong.

Background
After the founding of the Tang dynasty by Emperor Gaozu of Tang, the emperor's eldest son Li Jiancheng was established as the heir apparent, but he was often overshadowed by his younger brother Li Shimin. For instance, Li Shimin was instrumental in defeating several of Tang's major rivals. He had led the attack on Dou Jiande and Wang Shichong, whom he defeated in the battle of Hulao, which gained him prestige among his contemporaries. Meanwhile, Li Jiancheng was stationed along the northern frontier to guard it against the Tujue, which left him unable to build up a similar reputation. Eventually, Emperor Gaozu elevated Li Shimin's position above all other nobles. He also placed Li Shimin in charge of the civil and military administration of the eastern plain, with Luoyang as its headquarters. There, Li Shimin established himself and appointed about fifty civil and military officials, which made it possible for him to challenge the heir apparent's pre-eminence. In 621, he established the College of Literary Studies with a staff of eighteen scholars to serve as his advisors on state affairs. This may have insinuated in Li Jiancheng's mind that Li Shimin could harbour ambition to ascend to the throne himself. Henceforth, Li Jiancheng attempted to undermine Li Shimin by getting his staff members removed and reassigned to other posts.

Prince Li Shimin found himself unable to gain support in the capital Chang'an or inside the imperial palaces, as he was often away on military expeditions. He mostly relied on Luoyang where he could successfully build strong support among military and civil officials. Meanwhile, in Chang'an, Crown Prince Li Jiancheng was increasing his power by recruiting more than two thousand men to serve in the Changlin troops, which he stationed at the East Palace near the Changlin Gate. He was also allied with his second younger brother Prince Li Yuanji. They had the support of Emperor Gaozu's consorts, who often interceded with court affairs on behalf of the two princes.

There were allegations that Yang Wengan was raising troops for Li Jiancheng—who was left in charge of the capital while Emperor Gaozu was away in his summer palace—to stage a coup for the throne. Whether Li Jiancheng was actually involved is still disputed among historians. Yang Wengan was the regional commander of Qingzhou in Gansu and a former guard of Li Jiancheng at the East Palace. The plot was disclosed to the authorities, so Li Jiancheng was summoned from Chang'an and Yang Wengan was summoned from his garrison post. Li Jiancheng went to seek forgiveness against the advice of a subordinate to seize the throne. In contrast, Yang Wengan raised his troops and rebelled in the 6th month of 624. Emperor Gaozu sent Li Shimin to put down the rebellion, but Yang's own subordinates killed him after the imperial forces arrived at the scene. Emperor Gaozu initially offered Li Shimin the position of heir apparent in light of Yang's rebellion. However, Li Jiancheng's supporters, Li Yuanji, the palace ladies, and Minister Feng Deyi interceded to clear Li Jiancheng from the affair. Thus, Emperor Gaozu allowed Li Jiancheng to remain the heir apparent, but exiled some of Li Jiancheng's advisors and at least one member of Li Shimin's staff.

Some canonical texts have asserted that prior to the coup, Prince Li Shimin survived a poisoning attempt by his two brothers. According to the Jiu Tangshu, it happened prior to 626, while the Zizhi Tongjian dates it to the 6th lunar month of 626, placing it within three days of the coup.  states that the latter interpretation is most probably the one to be incorrect, since the poisoning had rendered Li Shimin seriously ill. It is still disputed when or whether this poisoning actually happened. Crown Prince Li Jiancheng and Prince Li Yuanji successfully plotted the dismissal of Fang Xuanling and Du Ruhui, Li Shimin's principal advisors, from service. Li Shimin's general Yuchi Jingde escaped an assassination attempt ordered by the two princes, but he was later slandered by the two princes at court and came near execution if it had not been for Li Shimin's intercession. By 626, Li Shimin became increasingly worried by his brothers' successful machinations in turning Emperor Gaozu against him and in removing his staff members.

Events leading to the incident
In early 626, the Tujue attacked the frontier of the Tang empire. At Li Jiancheng's recommendation, Li Yuanji was commissioned for a military campaign against these hostile forces, thus Li Shimin's best generals and crack troops were transferred to Li Yuanji. Thereafter, Li Shimin received word from his men that Li Jiancheng and Li Yuanji had taken preparations to assassinate him when he would see off Li Yuanji as was the custom during the onset of a military campaign.

Li Shimin decided to take action and planned to dispose of his two brothers at the advice of his subordinates, especially Zhangsun Wuji, Fang Xuanling, Du Ruhui, Yuchi Jingde, and Hou Junji. Li Shimin sent Zhangsun to recall his two most important advisors Fang Xuanling and Du Ruhui to help plan the course of action. After being summoned in secrecy, Fang and Du disguised themselves as Taoist priests and traveled to Li Shimin's camp to discuss the strategy. Li Shimin also bribed Chang He, who at the time was the military commander guarding the Xuanwu Gate, into following his orders. Few years prior, Chang had been an officer under Li Shimin, but he was eventually reassigned to a key position at the Xuanwu Gate in 624.

Eventually, Li Shimin submitted a message to his father, Emperor Gaozu, accusing Li Jiancheng and Li Yuanji of having illicit affairs with several consorts of the emperor. After receiving the message, Emperor Gaozu summoned Li Shimin to come for an audience the following morning. The emperor also requested for his personal advisors Pei Ji, Xiao Yu, Chen Shuda, Feng Lun, and Yan Shigu to come. However, Consort Zhang learned of Li Shimin's accusations and informed Li Jiancheng. Li Jiancheng summoned Li Yuanji to deliberate together on how to deal with the difficult situation. Li Yuanji opted to not attend the imperial court that morning, but to excuse themselves due to "illness" and prepare the troops, so they could observe the situation. However, Li Jiancheng said that the troops were already prepared and wanted to leave for the Palace City to hear first-hand what was amiss. While Li Jiancheng and Li Yuanji left at dawn to consult Emperor Gaozu personally, Li Shimin and his followers had taken control over Xuanwu Gate.

Coup d'état
On the dawn of 2 July 626, Prince Li Shimin and his followers arrived at the Xuanwu Gate, where they awaited the arrival of Crown Prince Li Jiancheng and Prince Li Yuanji. Chang He, a military officer stationed at Xuanwu Gate, also led his troops in support of Li Shimin on the day of the coup. As Li Jiancheng and Li Yuanji approached the Linhu Hall, they began to realize that a coup was about to unfold and immediately retreated eastward. Li Shimin rode towards his brothers and hailed them. Hereupon, Li Yuanji attempted to draw his bow to shoot his arrows at Li Shimin, but he did not manage to draw it. Li Shimin started to shoot his arrows at Li Jiancheng and killed him.

Yuchi Jingde and 70 horsemen caught up with Li Yuanji and shot at him, causing Li Yuanji to fall from his horse. However, Li Shimin's horse fled into the woods and became entangled with tree branches, which led to Li Shimin falling off his horse too and being unable to get up. Li Yuanji quickly grabbed Li Shimin's bow and tried to strangle his brother with it; however, Yuchi Jingde arrived and shouted at him, so Li Yuanji fled on foot to Wude Hall. Nevertheless, Yuchi Jingde overtook Li Yuanji and killed him with his arrows. Following the deaths of Li Jiancheng and Li Yuanji, while Li Shimin's forces held Xuanwu Gate under their control, fighting broke out between the two armed factions. When Yuchi Jingde arrived with the heads of the two princes, their retainers quickly dispersed with their troops.

Aftermath
Emperor Gaozu of Tang was sailing on a lake inside the Palace City during the time of the coup according to the Jiu Tangshu and Zizhi Tongjian.  speculates that the emperor was alarmed by the impending crisis, thus he withdrew himself from the situation. The emperor surrounded himself with senior officials who were friendly to Li Shimin, because he possibly realized that Li Shimin was the cause of the unfolding events and had better military connections that provided him with the advantage. The officials were Pei Ji, Xiao Yu, Chen Shuda, Feng Lun, Yan Shigu, Dou Dan, and Yuwen Shiji. 

During the ongoing battle, according to the Jiu Tangshu and Zizhi Tongjian, Li Shimin sent Yuchi Jingde fully armed into the Palace City to announce the news of the situation to Emperor Gaozu. Emperor Gaozu asked who was disturbing the peace and why he came, whereupon Yuchi Jingde replied that the Prince of Qin had taken arms to execute the heir apparent and the Prince of Qi who were disturbing the peace and, apprehensive that his majesty would be alarmed, sent him to stand guard. The sources agree that Emperor Gaozu was satisfied by Yuchi Jingde's answer. The Zizhi Tongjian adds that Emperor Gaozu asked his officials what ought to be done as he had not anticipated the events. As described in the text, two of them completely exonerated Li Shimin, as they spoke highly meritoriously of him, said that the killings of the two princely brothers served as a punishment, and recommended Emperor Gaozu to appoint him as the heir apparent.

Even though Li Shimin had come out victorious, he still needed a positive appraisal for his conduct from the emperor to prevent further internal conflict. At Yuchi's advice, Emperor Gaozu issued an imperial edict ordering the remaining forces to stop their resistance and submit to Li Shimin. In the end, Li Shimin had taken full control over the Tang government. Within three days, Emperor Gaozu named Li Shimin the heir apparent. On the 9th day of the 8th month, he abdicated in favour for Li Shimin. He became a Taishang Huang (Retired Emperor) himself, only appearing in public sometimes to attend ceremonial functions at court.

In 632, Ma Zhou charged that the retired Emperor Gaozu had settled in the Da'an Palace, which he considered an inhospitable place as it was built on low-lying lands at Chang'an that were plagued by dampness and heat during the summer. According to him, ever since Emperor Taizong moved to the countryside during the summers, his retired father was left behind in Chang'an to suffer in the summer heat; however, his father would always decline any invitation to spend the summer together when Emperor Taizong eventually did invite him. Ma Zhou also charged that Emperor Taizong had not visited his father for a long time even though they lived nearby each other. Ever since the bloody palace coup, it seemed that father and son had drifted apart to such an extent that their relationship never healed. In 634, Emperor Taizong of Tang launched the construction of the Daming Palace. He ordered the construction of the new summer palace as a residence for his father, but Emperor Gaozu grew ill and never witnessed the palace's completion before his death in the 5th month of 635.

Notes

References

Bibliography

 
 
 
 

620s conflicts
Battles involving the Tang dynasty
History of Xi'an
7th century in China
Military coups in China
626
Emperor Taizong of Tang
7th-century coups d'état and coup attempts
Familicides